Jean-Pierre Destrumelle (2 January 1941 – April 2002) was a French professional football player and manager. As a player, he was a midfielder.

International career 
Destrumelle was a B, youth, amateur, and military international for France during his career.

Honours 
Marseille

 Coupe de France: 1968–69

Paris Saint-Germain

 Division 2: 1970–71

References

External links
 

1941 births
2002 deaths
French footballers
People from Cambrai
FC Rouen players
Olympique de Marseille players
Paris Saint-Germain F.C. players
Ligue 1 players
Ligue 2 players
French football managers
Valenciennes FC managers
SC Bastia managers
Olympique Lyonnais managers
US Orléans managers
AS Béziers Hérault (football) managers
Association football midfielders
France B international footballers
France amateur international footballers
Sportspeople from Nord (French department)
Footballers from Hauts-de-France